Waldenström may refer to one of the following individuals:

Paul Petter Waldenström (1838-1917), Swedish theologian who became the most prominent leader of the free church movement in late 19th century Sweden.
Jan G. Waldenström (1906-1996), Swedish physician who identified the condition known as Waldenström macroglobulinemia. Grand-nephew of Paul Petter Waldenström.

See also
 Waldenström's macroglobulinemia